Black Dub may refer to:
 Black Dub (group), a group formed by musician Daniel Lanois
 Black Dub (album), the debut album by Black Dub
 Black Dub (Isle of Man), part of the Snaefell Mountain Course used for TT and Manx Grand Prix motorcycle racing
 Black Dub (stream), a stream in Cumbria which runs from Langrigg to Allonby Bay